This article contains a list of battles with most United States military fatalities, in terms of American deaths.

Introduction
This article lists battles and campaigns in which the number of U.S. soldiers killed was higher than 1,000. The battles and campaigns that reached that number of deaths in the field are so far limited to the American Civil War, World War I, World War II, Korean War, and one campaign during the Vietnam War (the Tet Offensive from January 30 to September 23, 1968). The campaign that resulted in the most US military deaths was the Battle of Normandy (June 6 to August 25, 1944) in which 29,204 soldiers were killed fighting against Nazi Germany.

The bloodiest single day in the history of the United States military was June 6, 1944, with 2,500 soldiers killed during the Invasion of Normandy on D-Day. The second-highest single-day toll was the Battle of Antietam with 2,108 dead. 

The deadliest single-day battle in American history, if all engaged armies are considered, is the Battle of Antietam with 5,389 killed, including both United States and Confederate soldiers (total casualties for both sides was 22,717 dead, wounded, or missing Union and Confederate soldiers September 17, 1862). 

The origins of the U.S. military can be traced to the Americans' fight for independence from their former colonial power, Great Britain, in the American Revolutionary War (1775–1783). The three bloodiest conflicts have been American Civil War (1861–1865), World War I (1917–1918), and World War II (1941–45). Other significant conflicts involving the United States ordered by casualties include the Korean War (1950–1953), the Vietnam War (1964–1973), the War in Afghanistan (2001–2021), and various conflicts in the Middle East. For most of its existence, America has been involved in one or another military conflict.

Scope and definitions
The definition of "battle" as a concept in military science has been a dynamic one through the course of military history, changing with the changes in the organization, employment and technology of military forces. From the beginning of history until the 20th century, "battle" has usually meant a military clash over a relatively small area, lasting only a few days at most (and often just one day); for instance, the Battle of Waterloo, begun, fought, and ended on 18 June 1815 on a field a few kilometers across.

Another use of the term "battle," which is seen particularly in the 20th century, is as equivalent to military campaign (military operations on a larger scale and longer duration, on the operational or even strategic level); for instance the Battle of the Atlantic, fought over several years (1939 to 1945) in an area constituting about twenty percent of the Earth's surface.

Since both types of "battles" are not usefully comparable in many ways, including casualty comparisons, this article is divided into two sections, one for battle in the older more restricted sense and one for campaigns, many of which are also called battles.

There are actions at the margins that could be reasonably assigned to either list. For instance, the Battle of Spotsylvania lasted 14 days, but the main part was fought on a small field (less than three kilometers on a side), and in this way being more in the nature of a siege (a military action typically of long duration but in covering a relatively small area). Like the similar Battle of Cold Harbor, also part of the Overland Campaign, it is included in this article on the Battles list. The Battle of Saint-Mihiel, lasting only about four days, but on a larger field (roughly 12 kilometers by 25 kilometers), is also included on the Battles list.

The term casualty in warfare can often be confusing. It often does not refer to those who are killed on the battlefield; rather, it refers to those who can no longer fight. That can include disabled by injuries, disabled by psychological trauma, captured, deserted, or missing. A casualty is only a soldier who is no longer available for the immediate battle or campaign, the major consideration in combat, and the number of casualties is simply the number of members of a unit who are not available for duty. For example, during the Seven Days Battles during the American Civil War (June 25 to July 1, 1862) there were 5,228 killed, 23,824 wounded and 7,007 missing or taken prisoner for a total of 36,059 casualties.  The word casualty has been used in a military context since at least 1513. In this article the numbers killed refer to those killed in action, killed by disease or someone who died from their wounds.

Battles

Campaigns

See also
 Deadliest single days of World War I
 American units with the highest percentage of casualties per conflict

Notes

References

Sources

 - Total pages: 271 
 - Total pages: 264 

 - Total pages: 152 

 - Total pages: 207 
 - Total pages: 992
 - Total pages: 602

 - Total pages: 248 
 - Total pages: 848 
 - Total pages: 192 

 
 
  - Total pages: 192 

 - Total pages: 512 
 - Total pages: 384 
 - Total pages: 796 
 

 - Total pages: 121
 

 - Total pages: 370
 - Total pages: 2524 
 - Total pages: 355 

 
 
 - Total pages: 317 
 - Total pages: 416 
 - Total pages: 1920 

United States
Lists by death toll
United States military-related lists
United States
United States
American Civil War-related lists
Military fatalities